Gallatin is a surname. Notable people with the surname include:

Albert Gallatin (1761-1849), Swiss-American ethnologist, linguist, politician, founder of New York University, diplomat, and United States Secretary of the Treasury
Albert Eugene Gallatin (1881-1952), New York art collector, author, and artist; great-grandson of Albert Gallatin
Harry Gallatin (1927-2015), basketball player and coach
James Gallatin (1796-1876), president of Gallatin National Bank, son of Albert Gallatin